Prosper Mimart (1859-1928) was a clarinetist and instructor at the Paris Conservatoire.

He was the dedicatee of Debussy's Première rhapsodie and gave the premiere of the work in 1911.

References 

1859 births
1928 deaths
French classical clarinetists
Academic staff of the Conservatoire de Paris